Eva Soriano Sánchez (Reus, March 4, 1990) is a Spanish comedian and presenter.

Trajectory 
She graduated in Tourism and Leisure from Rovira i Virgili University, where she concluded her studies in 2013. Interested in acting, she trained in acting at the Metropolis c. e. film and theater school in Madrid. During this stage, she participated, as part of her training, in theatrical and musical performances and collaborated in several short films made by the school. She also did micro-theater. She continued performing monologues. In 2017, she participated in El Club de la Comedia. In 2018, she participated in La resistencia, attended as a guest on Ilustres ignorantes, and was a collaborator in Yu, no te pierdas nada. She worked in Late motiv on #0 as a collaborator in the section "Gente random" in 2018. She was co-host of Ese programa del que usted me habla on La 2 rom January 2019 to January 2020, replacing Marta Flich, who was previously a collaborator. She intervened as a collaborator in the program Hoy no se sale on Ubeat, which premiered in February 2019. She was part of the humor program Las que faltaban on #0, which premiered in March 2019, a late night in which female comedians were the featured protagonists. In 2022, she began presenting the program La Noche D on RTVE. 

In Puerto Rico, she drew a lot of attention when in Late motiv she imitated Bad Bunny and her particular way of singing. The producer EFKTO turned it into a song, going viral on the social network TikTok. In August 2021, it was announced that Eva and the comedian Iggy Rubn would be in charge of the new morning show on Europa FM.

Filmography

Theater plays

MicroteaMicro Theatertro

Television and radio

References 

Spanish comedians
Women humorists
Living people
1990 births